William Mills may refer to:

Politics
William Mills (1750–1820), MP for St Ives 1790–96 and Coventry 1805–12
William J. Mills (1849–1915), Governor of the New Mexico Territory
William George Mills (1859–1933), sheep breeder and politician in South Australia
William Oswald Mills (1924–1973), American politician
William Thomas Mills (1924–2011), merchant and politician in Ontario, Canada
William Stratton Mills (born 1932), politician in Northern Ireland
William Mills (Lord Provost) (1776–1857), Scottish cotton merchant and Lord Provost of Glasgow 1834 to 1837
William Ellison Mills (1859–1930), American leather manufacturer and politician from New York

Sports
William Mills (English cricketer) (1820–1877), English lawyer and cricketer
William Mills (New Zealand cricketer) (1875–1962), New Zealand cricketer
Willie Mills (baseball) (1877–1933), American professional baseball pitcher
Billy Mills (footballer) (1891–?), English footballer
Billy Mills (racing driver) (1898–1937), South African racing driver
Willie Mills (1915–1991), Scottish professional footballer
Bill Mills (baseball) (1919–2019), Major League Baseball player
Billy Mills (born 1938), American athlete

Others
William Mills (actor) (1701–1750), British stage actor
William Augustus Mills (1777–1844), Major General in the War of 1812
William Mills (surveyor) (1844–1916), Australian surveyor
William Mills (bishop) (1846–1917), Canadian Anglican bishop of Ontario, 1901–1917
William Mills (inventor) (1856–1932), inventor of the Mills bomb
William Corless Mills (1860–1928), US museum curator
William Mills (businessman) (1866–1916), Western Australian businessman
William Hobson Mills (1873–1959), British organic chemist
William Harold Mills (1921-2007), American mathematician who proved existence of Mills' constant
Billy G. Mills (born 1929), Los Angeles Superior Court judge and City Council member
Billy Mills (poet) (born 1954), Irish poet